Bruce Holloway (born June 27, 1963) is a Canadian former professional ice hockey defenceman. Holloway played in two games with the Vancouver Canucks in the 1984–85 NHL season. He had a reputation as an excellent playmaker in the junior and minor leagues.

Born in Revelstoke, British Columbia, Holloway played with the local Revelstoke Bruins of the BCJHL. He then moved on to the WHL where he played for four teams. He was drafted 136th overall by the Canucks in 1981. Over his career he was considered a tough checker who could deliver a solid physical game. His son, Dylan Holloway was drafted 14th overall in the 2020 NHL Draft by the Edmonton Oilers

Holloway's professional ice hockey debut was with the American Hockey League's Fredericton Express during the 1983–84 AHL season.

Career statistics

Regular season and playoffs

External links

1963 births
Living people
Billings Bighorns players
Brandon Wheat Kings players
Canadian expatriate ice hockey players in the United States
Canadian ice hockey defencemen
Fredericton Express players
Ice hockey people from British Columbia
Kalamazoo Wings (1974–2000) players
Kamloops Junior Oilers players
People from Revelstoke, British Columbia
Peoria Rivermen (IHL) players
Regina Pats players
Revelstoke Bruins players
St. Catharines Saints players
Vancouver Canucks draft picks
Vancouver Canucks players